The 1952 Oklahoma Sooners football team represented the University of Oklahoma in the 1952 college football season. It was the 58th season of play for the Sooners. Led by head coach Bud Wilkinson, the Sooners offense scored 407 points, while the defense allowed only 141.

Schedule

Roster
QB Eddie Crowder, Sr.
G J.D. Roberts, Jr.
HB Billy Vessels, Sr.
E Carl Allison, So.

Rankings

Awards and honors
Billy Vessels, Heisman Trophy

Postseason

NFL Draft
Six Sooners were selected in the 1953 NFL Draft, held on January 22.

References

Oklahoma
Oklahoma Sooners football seasons
Big Eight Conference football champion seasons
Oklahoma Sooner football